MYBYK is a station-based bicycle-sharing and renting service in India.

History 
Started in Ahmedabad in May 2014. Founded by Arjit Soni, and the project was supported by private sector and Amdavad Municipal Corporation. The project was started with 200 bicycles and 4 stations. The project was started in conjunction with Ahmedabad Bus Rapid Transit System(BRTS). The bicycle stations are located at BRTS stations, which facilitates public transport users to use bicycle for to and fro movement from BRTS station to home/office.

Later MYBYK expanded its service to Jamnagar, Mumbai and Udaipur operating with 5,500 cycles. In 2022, MYBYK started services in Nagpur in association with Nagpur Metro with hubs at metro stations for last mile connectivity 

In 2022, the company expanded services to the largest city of central India Indore in partnership with Atal Indore City Transport Service Limited with 1000 cycles, and an approved plan of further 3000 bikes.

Overview 
The bicycle can be hired through mobile app.

Reliance Industries Limited, ISRO, Baxter, TATA, ONGC,  Suzuki Motors Gujarat, SRF Chemicals Ltd., Baxter, Wonder cement and Adani Shantigram Township are B2B clients of MYBYK.

Gallery

See also 
 List of bicycle-sharing systems

References 

Community bicycle programs
Cycling in India
Bicycle sharing in India
2014 establishments in Gujarat